DFB may refer to:

 Deerfield Beach, Florida, a city
 Decafluorobutane, a fluorocarbon gas
 Dem Franchize Boyz, former hip hop group, Atlanta, Georgia 
 Dfb, Köppen climate classification for Humid continental climate
 Distributed-feedback laser, a diffraction laser system
 Dublin Fire Brigade, Ireland
 Dysfunctional Family BBQ, an annual K-Rockathon event
 Furka Steam Railway, Dampfbahn Furka-Bergstrecke, Switzerland
 German Football Association, Deutscher Fußball-Bund or DFB, the national football governing body of Germany